Otvorena vrata (Serbian Cyrillic: Отворена врата), is a Serbian comedy television series filmed in 1994-1995. Broadcast on state television RTS, it ran for 2 seasons (34 episodes in total) featuring a regular family living in Belgrade during the 1990s.

The show was created by Biljana Srbljanović and Miloš Radović and Jelena Brkic and Zika Mustikla, starring Vesna Trivalić, Milan Gutović, Bogdan Diklić, Nikola Đuričko, Sofija Jović, Bojana Maljević, Olivera Marković and Zoran Cvijanović, with guest stars such as: Mirjana Karanović, Nikola Simić, Seka Sablić, Branka Katić, Mira Stupica.

The show had many reruns over the following years, and acquired a cult following.

In spring of 2012, after the Serbian presidential election results were announced, Bojana Maljević announced on her Twitter account that she and Biljana Srbljanović were thinking about doing another season of the show. In the following days the idea of the third season was officially confirmed and members of the original cast started announcing that they would take part in the project.

Plot 
Katarina Anđelić, nicknamed "Cakana", lives in an apartment with her two children, her brother Bata, and his daughter. She is a sculptor and painter, but there are not many people who see her potential. Her ex-husband, Dragoslav, is trying to win her back after cheating on her earlier, which led to the breakup of the marriage.

Cast

Main
 Vesna Trivalić as Katarina "Cakana" Anđelić
 Bogdan Diklić as Svetislav "Bata" Anđelić, Cakana's brother
 Milan Gutović as Dragoslav Jakovljević, Cakana's ex-husband
 Bojana Maljević as Ana Anđelić, Bata's daughter
 Nikola Đuričko as Vojislav "Vojkan/Voja" Jakovljević, Cakana and Dragoslav's older son
 Sofija Jović as Milica Jakovljević, Cakana and Dragoslav's younger daughter
 Olivera Marković as Angelina Savić, neighbour (Season 1 and 2)
 Zoran Cvijanović as Milorad Ugrinović, neighbour
 Teodora Jelisavčić as Keti, Milica's daughter (Season 3)
 Anica Dobra as Leta (Season 3)

Supporting/Recurring
 Vlasta Velisavljević as Tomislav Pavlović, Cakana and Bata's uncle
 Branimir Brstina as Konstantin de Sisti, Dragoslav's cousin
 Mira Stupica as Kristina Trobožić, Dragoslav's mother
 Branka Katić as Sandra "Ćora", Ana's friend
 Rastko Lupulović as Milan "Milanče" Jovanović, Ana's ex-boyfriend
 Branislav Lečić as Dr. Gazivoda, psychiatrist
 Milica Mihajlović as Anka Crnotravka, folk singer and neighbour

Revival
In 2012, seventeen years after the show's original run, Bojana Maljević announced her interest in reviving the series. Later on, it was officially confirmed that a third season was in the making with all of the original cast reuniting.

In November 2012, it was announced that the original creators of the show, Biljana Srbljanović and Miloš Radović, will not take part in writing or production for the upcoming series. After the press started speculating for their reasons for leaving the show, Biljana said "Money is not a problem, the fee I was offered was more than enough." and added that she didn't want to get involved unless she could have complete creative control. Miloš decided not to comment on the issue, only saying "We didn't reach an agreement with the producers.".

List of episodes

Season 1

Original name for episode 22 is "Tri sudbonosna dana u životu Dragoslava Jakovljevića, zvanog Draganče, koji započinju mirno i naivno da bi zadobili iznenadan i neočekivan obrt ili Čiji si ti, mali?".

Season 2

Season 3 
Actress Bojana Maljević revealed some details of the third season saying that the series will feature all of the original cast and that the storyline will skip ahead from where they left at the end of the second season.

Season 4

References

External links 
 Otvorena vrata at IMDb

1994 Serbian television series debuts
2014 Serbian television series endings
1990s Serbian television series
2000s Serbian television series
2010s Serbian television series
Serbian comedy television series
Serbian-language television shows
Radio Television of Serbia original programming
Television shows set in Serbia
Television shows filmed in Serbia